Filip Bernadowski (born 20 June 1979 in Łódź, Poland) is a Polish ice dancer.

Career 
Early in his career, Bernadowski competed with Karolina Dobrodziej.

From 1997 to 2001, he competed with partner Aleksandra Kauc. They were two-time Polish bronze medalists and competed at the World Figure Skating Championships, the European Figure Skating Championships, and the World Junior Figure Skating Championships. Early in their partnership, they were coached by Bozena Bernadowska and later they worked with Maria Olszewska-Lelonkiewicz.

Following his retirement from competitive skating, Bernadowski began performing professionally. He has appeared on Poland's Dancing on Ice. In the first season, which took place in 2007, he partnered with Anna Popek and placed 4th. In the second season, which took place in March 2008, he partnered with Karolina Nowakowska and placed 6th. In the third season, he partnered with Katarzyna Zielińska.

Personal life 
His younger brother, Maciej Bernadowski, has also competed in skating. Their mother, Bozena Bernadowska, is a skating coach.

Programs 
(with Kauc)

Results

With Aleksandra Kauc

With Karolina Dobrodziej

References

External links 
 

1979 births
Polish male ice dancers
Living people
Sportspeople from Łódź
Competitors at the 2001 Winter Universiade